The 2014–15 GlobalPort Batang Pier season was the third season of the franchise in the Philippine Basketball Association (PBA).

Key dates
August 24: The 2014 PBA Draft took place in Midtown Atrium, Robinson Place Manila.
November 27: Eric Gonzales was appointed as the team's interim head coach, while former head coach Pido Jarencio was reassigned as the team's consultant.

Draft picks

Roster

Philippine Cup

Eliminations

Standings

Game log

Playoffs

Bracket

Commissioner's Cup

Eliminations

Standings

Game log

Playoffs

Bracket

Transactions

Trades

Pre-draft

Draft day

Pre-season

Philippine Cup

Commissioner's Cup

Recruited imports

(* Asian import)

References

NorthPort Batang Pier seasons
GlobalPort